El Mago de los sueños (The Dream Wizard) is a 1966 Spanish animated film directed and produced by Francisco Macián.

Story
The film features the six children of the Telerin family, characters created by the brothers José Luis Moro and Santiago Moro. The Wizard gives each child a dream; the six dreams are presented in different graphical styles.

References

External links

1966 animated films
1966 films
Films based on works by Hans Christian Andersen
Spanish animated films
Films based on fairy tales